Kansas's 19th Senate district is one of 40 districts in the Kansas Senate. It had been represented by Democrat Anthony Hensley, the former Senate Minority Leader, since 1993; Hensley was defeated by Republican Rick Kloos in 2020.

Geography
District 19 covers all of Osage County and parts of Douglas, Jefferson, and Shawnee Counties, including much of eastern Topeka and southern Lawrence as well as Osage City, Carbondale, Lyndon, and Overbrook.

The district is located entirely within Kansas's 2nd congressional district, and overlaps with the 10th, 45th, 47th, 54th, 56th, 57th, 58th, 59th, and 76th districts of the Kansas House of Representatives.

Recent election results

2020

2016

2012

Federal and statewide results in District 19

References

19
Douglas County, Kansas
Jefferson County, Kansas
Osage County, Kansas
Shawnee County, Kansas